Phan Thong is a district (amphoe) of the province of Chonburi in Thailand.

Neighbouring districts are (from north clockwise) Bang Pakong, Ban Pho (both Chachoengsao province), Phanat Nikhom, Ban Bueng and Mueang Chonburi.

History & toponymy
The district is home to a large Catholic community. The community owns 10,000 rai of land in Ban Hua Pai of Tambon Khok Ki Non where the St Philip and St James Catholic Church is located. The church was founded by Francois Marie Guego, a French missionary who arrived in Thailand in 1867. His mission was to spread the Gospel in Chachoengsao. Today, more than 3,000 Catholics reside on the land. The community, the largest landholder in the area, is under pressure from developers to sell the property to feed the industrialization fostered by the Eastern Economic Corridor.

Its name Phan Thong literally translates to "golden pedestal tray". It is said that its name is distorted from the name of a local hunter (phran in Thai) "Thong", who led warlord Phraya Tak to flee the Burmese army from Ayutthaya to the eastern region during the second fall of Ayutthaya, before the counterattack and established himself as a new king Taksin the Great.

Administration

Central administration 
Phan Thong is divided into 11 sub-districts (tambons), which are further subdivided into 76 administrative villages (mubans).

Local administration 
There are two sub-district municipalities (thesaban tambons) in the district:
 Phan Thong consisting of parts of sub-district Phan Thong.
 Nong Tamlueng consisting of sub-district Nong Tamlueng and parts of sub-districts Map Pong and Nong Kakha.

There are eight subdistrict administrative organisations (SAO) in the district:
 Phan Thong Nong Kakha consisting of parts of sub-districts Phan Thong and Nong Kakha.
 Map Pong consisting of parts of sub-district Map Pong.
 Nong Hong consisting of sub-district Nong Hong.
 Khok Khi Non consisting of sub-district Khok Khi Non.
 Ban Kao consisting of sub-district Ban Kao.
 Na Pradu consisting of sub-district Na Pradu.
 Bang Nang consisting of sub-district Bang Nang.
 Ko Loi Bang Hak consisting of sub-districts Ko Loi and Bang Hak.

References

Phan Thong